James Hart Branston (5 July 1879–1954) was an English footballer who played in the Football League for Preston North End and Rotherham County.

References

19th-century births
1970 deaths
English footballers
Association football goalkeepers
English Football League players
Grimsby Town F.C. players
Rotherham County F.C. players
Preston North End F.C. players